Wanyange Girls School is a girls' boarding government-aided secondary school on Nyange hill in the Jinja District of the Eastern Region, Uganda, founded in 1960.

History
When Wanyange Girls School opened on 1 March 1960, it was temporarily located at Buckley High School in Iganga. In 1967, it was provisionally merged with Busoga College Mwiri whilst keeping its own location on Nyange hill, but having the name Busoga College Wanyanga. In 1969, it was given its independence again. In 2013, the school was temporarily closed because of a students' strike which followed similar strikes in other schools in Jinja District. In 2016, Schoolnet Uganda rated Wanyange Girls School as the tenth best girls' school in Uganda. In 2018, the first RCMRD Uganda Space Challenge was held at Wanyange Girls School after two RCMRD Space Challenges had been held in Kenya in 2017 and 2018.

Notable staff
Florence Muranga

Notable alumnae
Queen Sylvia of Buganda, the current Nnabagereka or Queen of Buganda
Beti Kamya-Turwomwe, businesswoman and politician
Esther Mbulakubuza Mbayo, politician
Margaret Lamwaka Odwar, politician

References

External links 
 Wanyange Girls School at Schoolnet Uganda

Girls' schools in Uganda
Boarding schools in Uganda
Jinja District 
Educational institutions established in 1960
1960 establishments in Uganda